CJSC, Aviaprad was an airline based in Yekaterinburg, Russia. It operated domestic and international cargo charters from Yekaterinburg to destinations within the CIS, Western Europe, China and the United Arab Emirates. Its main base was Koltsovo International Airport, Yekaterinburg.

History 

The airline was established in 1996. It is wholly owned by Ural Civil Aviation Works. On 9 November 2006, services started between Yekaterinburg and Moscow using a newly acquired Boeing 757-200 wet leased from VIM Airlines. More aircraft later joined the fleet and more destinations were added.

But in February 2008, all bookings were suddenly suspended with the flights transferred to other airlines.  Despite still being an officially registered company, all operations were ceased. The employees were laid off and the aircraft returned to the lessors or offered for sale.

In 2019, information appeared that the company plans to resume freight traffic with new owners and receive a new certificate of the operator.

Destinations 

By the end of 2007, the company served the following destinations:
Russia
 Anapa
 Beloyarskiy
 Chelyabinsk (hub)
 Irkutsk
 Khanty-Mansiysk
 Krasnodar
 Bokhtar
 Magnitogorsk
 Mirny
 Mineralnye Vody
 Moscow-Domodedovo
 Norilsk
 Novosibirsk
 Novy Urengoy
 Nyagan
 Nizhnevartovsk
 Saint Petersburg
 Samara
 Sochi
 Sovetskiy
 Surgut
 Ufa
 Ust-Kamenogorsk
 Yekaterinburg (hub)
Germany
 Frankfurt
 Hannover
United Arab Emirates
 Dubai

Fleet 

The Aviaprad fleet consisted of the following aircraft (in June 2007): 

2 Boeing 737-500
4 Yakovlev Yak-42 (All leased to Saratov Airlines)
2 Antonov An-28 (code shared with "Region-Avia")
2 Tupolev Tu-154M (All leased to VIM Airlines)

In mid-2007, Aviaprad introduced two former Kuban Airlines Tupolev Tu-154M aircraft (RA-85795 and RA-85123) to its fleet to operate charter services to Europe.

Previously operated

1 Ilyushin Il-76TD

References

External links

Official website 
Aviaprad Fleet

Companies based in Yekaterinburg
Airlines established in 1996
Airlines disestablished in 2008
Defunct airlines of Russia